Christopher Richard Watson (born 1952) is an English musician and sound recordist specialising in natural history. He was a founding member of the musical group Cabaret Voltaire, and Watson's work as a wildlife sound recordist has covered television documentaries and experimental musical collaborations.

Music 
Watson was a founding member of two experimental music groups, Cabaret Voltaire and The Hafler Trio.

He has released several solo albums of field recordings including: Outside the Circle of Fire, Stepping into the Dark (which won an Award of Distinction at the 2000 Prix Ars Electronica Festival in Linz, Austria), Weather Report, and El Tren Fantasma. He has also released a variety of works in collaboration with other artists, including Star Switch On, a collaboration with Mika Vainio of Pan Sonic, Philip Jeck, Hazard, Fennesz, AER (Jon Wozencroft, aka "Alpha Echo Romeo"), and Biosphere. In 2007 he released Storm with BJNilsen, and in 2011 he released "Cross-Pollination" with Marcus Davidson. All of these recordings were released on Touch. Touch releases material digitally through Bandcamp.

The Weather Report album from 2003 was named as "One of the thousand albums you should hear before you die" in The Guardian.

Sound recording 
His sound recording career began in 1981 when he joined Tyne Tees Television. His television work includes Bill Oddie Back in the USA and Springwatch.

In 2006 he was awarded an honorary Doctor of Technology degree by the University of the West of England "in recognition of his outstanding contribution to sound recording technology, especially in the field of natural history and documentary location sound".

In 2010 he devised an art project at Liverpool's Alder Hey Children's Hospital, using sound recordings made by children to calm other young patients as they received injections and other treatments.

Radio programmes
Watson has made and been featured in a number of BBC radio programmes:

The Reed Bed
Series of five, fifteen-minute radio programmes, broadcast on BBC Radio Four from 19–23 March 2007.
A Guide to Garden Birds
Series of five, fifteen-minute radio programmes, broadcast weekly on Radio Four from 22 May 2007
A Guide to Farmland Birds
Series of five, fifteen-minute radio programmes, broadcast weekly on Radio Four from 22 August 2011

Personal life
Watson attended Rowlinson School and Stannington College (now part of Sheffield College), both in Sheffield. He is married to Maggie, who appeared momentarily on-screen with him in episode 3 of Autumnwatch 2010.

He is a Policy & Enterprise Fellow at Durham University's Institute of Advanced Study.

On 26 August 2019, he appeared on the podcast Trees A Crowd with David Oakes.

Album discography

Solo
Sunsets wordless recording made at Breachacha on Coll 1994
Stepping into the Dark (1996, Touch (UK) Touch Music)
Outside the Circle of Fire (1998, Touch (UK) Touch Music)
Weather Report (2003, Touch (UK) Touch Music)
Cima Verde (2008, Fondazione Edmund Mach and LoL Productions)
El Tren Fantasma (2011, Touch (UK) Touch Music)
In St Cuthbert's Time (2013, Touch (UK) Touch Music)

Collaborations
Star Switch On with Mika Vainio, Philip Jeck, Hazard, Fennesz, AER, and Biosphere (2002, Touch (UK) Touch Music)
Number One with KK Null and Z'EV (2005, Touch (UK) Touch Music)
Storm with B. J. Nilsen (2006, Touch (UK) Touch Music)
Siren with Alec Finlay Platform Projects #  [CD EP]
Cross-Pollination (Chris Watson + Marcus Davidson album) (2011, Touch (UK) Touch Music)

References

External links
 Chris Watson's homepage
 Discography and archived reviews - Touch 
 
 
 
 Chris Watson on SilenceRadio.org
 Swedish television interview

English experimental musicians
1952 births
Living people
Musicians from Sheffield
Wildlife sound recordists
Academics of Durham University
Cabaret Voltaire (band) members
Field recording